In the run-up to the 2021 Dutch general election, various organisations are carrying out opinion polling to gauge voting intentions in the Netherlands. Results of such polls are displayed in this list.

The date range for these opinion polls are from the previous general election, held on 15 March 2017, to the present day. The next election is scheduled for 17 March 2021. Snap elections occur fairly frequently in the Netherlands, having most recently occurred in 2012.

No sample sizes or date ranges are provided by Maurice de Hond's Peil.nl; the panel includes approximately 3,000 respondents per week. Data on sample sizes and dates for the first two Kantar Public polls was not provided. Because date ranges and sample sizes for the Ipsos Political Barometer is not archived, only the end dates are listed. The date of publication is the listed date for Peil.nl polls, while the end date is used for Ipsos, I&O Research, Kantar Public, and GfK (De Stemming/EenVandaag). Starting in January 2018, EenVandaag cooperates with Ipsos for De Peiling, and has dropped GfK as their pollster.

Projections

Graphical summary 
The averages in the graphs below were constructed using polls listed below conducted by the five major Dutch pollsters. The trendlines show local regressions representing seat totals (not vote percentages).

Seats 

There are 150 seats in total. Parties are denoted with en dashes if no indication is given of their level in polls.

Vote share

See also 
 Opinion polling for the 2017 Dutch general election

Notes

References

External links 
 Peilingwijzer (Dutch polling indicator) 
 AllePeilingen (All polls at a glance) 
 Europe Elects Polling Average and Polling database (All polls at a glance) 

2021